Christiane Bervoets (born 10 May 1948), known by the stage name Samantha, is a Belgian singer.

Her 1970 recordings of "Helicopter US Navy 66" and "Nachten Van Parijs" were very successful, and her 1971 song "Eviva España", written by Leo Caerts and Leo Rozenstraten, achieved widespread fame, was inducted into the Radio Belgium Hall of Fame, and - in a cover by Manolo Escobar - became "part of Spain's cultural identity in the 1970s".

In 2016, Bervoets received the Golden Lifetime Award at the Retro Festival Aarschot. As of 2017, she was living in a residential care center in Belgium.

References

External links
 official website

1948 births
20th-century Belgian women singers
20th-century Belgian singers
Belgian pop singers
Living people